Nawabshah railway station is located in the city of Nawabshah on main railway line in Pakistan. It is a major railway station of Pakistan Railways and was the junction of Nawabshah-Tando Adam loop and Nawabshah-Mirpur Khas meter gauge railway lines. It is the stop of almost all Express trains. The station is staffed and has advance and current reservation offices. Food stalls are also located on it platforms.

History
Nawabshah Railway Junction was constructed on Kotri - Rohri an alternate route of Kotri - Sukkur(now a section Kotri - Rohri of Karachi - Peshawar Main Line ML-1).

200 acars donated by Syed Nawab Ali Shah for a railway station of his town .

Published by Vijay Kumar Rajput

Services
The following trains stop at Nawabshah station:

The routes Nawabshah from linked to Karachi, Lahore, Rawalpindi, Peshawar, Multan, Faisalabad, Sargodha, Jhang, Attock, Rahim Yar Khan, Bahawalpur, Gujrat, Gujranwala, Rohri, Khanewal, Hyderabad and Nowshera.

See also
 List of railway stations in Pakistan
 Pakistan Railways

References

Railway stations in Shaheed Benazir Abad District
Railway stations on Mirpur Khas–Nawabshah Branch Line
Railway stations on Karachi–Peshawar Line (ML 1)